Help! I'm Trapped... is a series of 17 books written by Todd Strasser, published by Scholastic Press. With worldwide sales of over 10 million copies, the plots mainly center around a group of children and a machine that has the power to switch bodies.

The first of the series, Help! I'm Trapped in my Teacher's Body, was published in 1993.

Characters
 Jake Sherman – The protagonist, who constantly switches bodies due to accidents or pure selfishness. Although lacking good integrity, he is shown to make the right choices when necessary.
 Josh Hopka – One of Jake's best friends. Mischievous and facetious, he always sticks by Jake's side.
 Andy Kent – Jake's other best friend. Shown to be bit scatterbrained. Like Josh, he hangs out with Jake whenever necessary.
 Jessica Sherman- Jake's older sister. Known to disapprove against using the DITS, she tries helping Jake whenever he's in trouble.

The Series

External links
Author's website
List of books at Fantastic Fiction

Help I'm
Children's science fiction novels
Science fiction book series
Series of children's books
1990s children's books